Auguste Pompogne (born 5 December 1882; date of death unknown) was a French gymnast who competed in the 1912 Summer Olympics. In 1912 he finished 14th in the all-around competition.

References

1882 births
Year of death missing
French male artistic gymnasts
Olympic gymnasts of France
Gymnasts at the 1912 Summer Olympics